Cosme Damián de Churruca y Elorza (27 September 1761 – 21 October 1805) was a Basque Spanish noble, admiral of the Royal Spanish Armada, naval scientist and Mayor of Motrico. During the Battle of Trafalgar, he was the commander of the ship of the line San Juan Nepomuceno which he defended to his death.

Biography  
Churruca was born in Mutriku, he was the fourth son of Francisco de Churruca, mayor of the town. He received his early years education in the Seminary of Burgos, initially thinking of becoming a priest. Then, he entered the School of Bergara where he would become member of Royal Basque Society of Friends of the Country until his death. After finishing his studies, inspired by the adventures of his relative José Antonio de Gaztañeta, he joined the Naval Academy of Cadiz in 1776, and got his degree in the Naval Academy of Ferrol in 1778, becoming a naval officer.

In 1781, Churruca, as an officer of the Spanish Navy, performed heroically in a siege of Gibraltar under the command of Ignacio María de Álava, earning a distinguished reputation for his services. In 1805, just a few months before his death, Churruca married María Dolores Ruiz de Apodaca, niece of Juan Ruiz de Apodaca, naval officer and viceroy of New Spain.

Battle of Trafalgar 

The squadron to which the San Juan was assigned sailed on 13 August from the port of Ferrol. General Gravina had given Churruca a place of honour, the head of the vanguard. Churruca completed his mission with the highest merit and upon his arrival to Cadiz, redoubled his efforts in training his recently recruited and inexperienced civilian crew.
It was at this time he married Maria de los Dolores Ruiz de Apodaca, daughter of Brigadier don Vicente, and cousin of the duke of Venadito.

With the Spanish and French squadrons reunited in the port of Cadiz, they sailed on a course to Marticina, where they took the fort of Del Diamante and captured a British convoy consisting of 16 merchant ships; in these moments Villeneuve, the chief of the combined fleet, was informed of the presence of Nelson in the Antillas. Villeneuve now decided he had completed his objective, which was to draw British naval forces to the other shore of the Atlantic, so he decided to sail the combined fleet back to Ferrol.
However, in the cape of Finisterre, he bumped into the squadron of Admiral Calder, where a battle ensued. The majority of the French squadron continued to Ferrol, while the remaining ships were left to fend for themselves. Their defeat is attributed to the indecision and poor command of the chief of the combined squadron, Villeneuve, by Napoleon, who upon reading reports of the battle said: "The Spanish have behaved like lions, while their admiral only offered curses."

The combined fleet entered Ferrol after the battle, proceeding in continuation to La Coruña. From this port, Villeneuve set a course to Cadiz, ignoring Napoleon's order to go to Brest. Once there, despite the protests and opposing opinions of Churruca, Gravina and Alcalá-Galiano, Villeneuve abandoned the Bay of Cádiz to reach Nelson at the Cape of Trafalgar on 21 October 1805. Before sailing on 20 October, Churruca wrote to his brother:

21 October dawned, and in sight of the British fleet Churruca ordered the colours to be nailed to the mast, and ordered that they should not be taken down while he still lived. Under the command of Churruca, the San Juan Nepomuceno demonstrated military precision, daring and efficiency, despite finding itself alone against six English ships, including HMS Defiance, HMS Tonnant, HMS Bellerophon and HMS Dreadnought. After being reached by a cannonball which tore his leg, Churruca died with the admiration of his enemies, who displayed his vessel in Gibraltar to visitors with his name written in golden letters above the cabin, and advising those who would enter to remove their covers, as if don Cosme Damián de Churruca y Elorza was still present. His officers kept their word, and only lowered the colours after his death. Unable to break the circle of fire and in order to prevent the vessel sinking with all wounded trapped below, the San Juan yielded with over 100 dead and 150 wounded on board.

Legacy
Churruca was posthumously promoted to admiral, and in his memory his cousin received the title Count of Churruca. The events to which Churruca was a protagonist, were novelised in 1872 by Benito Pérez Galdós, in Trafalgar, the first title of his Episodios Nacionales.

A statue in his memory stands in his native Mutriku, as well as Ferrol, where a simple monument records his death by the Academy. In San Fernando there is a stone in the third pulpit of the Panteon de Marinos Ilustres (Pantheon of Illustrious Sailors) which reads:

In honour of Churruca's courage, his cabin bore his name on a brass plate, and all who entered were required to remove their hat as a mark of respect for a gallant enemy. HMS San Juan served as a supply hulk in Gibraltar until 1815, when she was broken up. 

In the 1942 Spanish film Raza, based on a semi-autobiographical script by then head of state Francisco Franco, the main characters are a family descending from Churruca.

In 1976 Spain issued a 7pta postage stamp portraying Churruca to honor him.

Bibliography 
  Foro Historia Naval de España

Bibliography
 Elogio histórico del Brigadier de la Real Armada Don Cosme Damián de Churruca, que murió en el combate de Trafalgar en 21 de octubre de 1805. Julián Baldomero de Churruca y Elorza, Madrid, 1806.
 Ferrer de Couto, José: Combate naval de Trafalgar. Imprenta de D. Wenceslao Ayguals de Izco. Madrid, 1851.
 Marliani, Manuel. Combate de Trafalgar. Vindicación de la Armada Española. Impreso de Orden Superior. Madrid, 1850.
 Alcalá Galiano, P.: El combate de Trafalgar. I.H.C.N. Ministerio de Defensa. Facsímil, Madrid, 2004.

External links 

1761 births
1805 deaths
Basque sailors
People from Debabarrena
Spanish untitled nobility
Spanish military personnel of the Napoleonic Wars
Spanish military personnel killed in action
Mayors of places in the Basque Country
Spanish naval officers